Loganville is a city in Walton and Gwinnett counties, Georgia, United States. The population was 10,458 at the 2010 census.

History
An early variant name was "Buncombe". It was then renamed after James Harvie Logan, an early settler.

The Georgia General Assembly incorporated Loganville as a town in 1887.

Geography
Loganville is in western Walton County, with the city limits extending west into southeastern Gwinnett County. U.S. Route 78 (Atlanta Highway) passes through the center of town, leading east  to Monroe, the Walton County seat, and west  to downtown Atlanta. Georgia State Route 20 leads northwest from Loganville  to Lawrenceville, the Gwinnett County seat, and southwest  to Conyers. Georgia State Route 81 leads northeast  to Winder and south  to Covington.

The population was 10,458 at the 2010 census.

Demographics

2020 census

As of the 2020 United States census, there were 14,127 people, 4,101 households, and 3,112 families residing in the city.

2010 census
As of the census of 2010, the population of Loganville was 10,458.  The median age was 34.8.  There were 3,825 households which represented a housing unit occupation rate of 91.6%.  69.6% of the occupied housing units were owner occupied.

The racial and ethnic composition of the population was 70.0% White, 22.1% Black, 0.3% Native American, 2.3% Asian, 0.1% Pacific Islander, 3.0% reporting some other race and 2.2% reporting two or more races. 6.8% of the population was Hispanic or Latino of any race.

Education
Loganville is a part of the Walton County board of education. Loganville has a full complement of grade schools from primary to high school.  Loganville High School recently moved into 8-AAAAA classification, based on student population.

Schools

Public schools
The following schools are part of the Walton County Public School System that serve the Loganville, Georgia area:

Loganville High School (Loganville, GA)
Walnut Grove High School (Loganville, GA)
Performance Learning Center, dual enrollment school that serves Loganville High School and Monroe Area High School(Monroe, GA)
Loganville Middle School (Loganville, GA)
Youth Middle School (Loganville, GA)
Loganville Elementary School (Loganville, GA)
Youth Elementary School (Loganville, GA)
Bay Creek Elementary School, formerly known as 'Loganville Primary School' (Loganville, GA)
Walnut Grove Elementary School (Walnut Grove, GA)
Sharon Elementary School (Loganville, GA)
Blaine Street Elementary School (Monroe, GA) formally known as Monroe Primary School

The following schools are part of the Gwinnett County Public Schools System:
 Magill Elementary School
Rosebud Elementary School
Grace Snell Middle School
 McConnell Middle School (Loganville, GA)
Grayson High School

Private schools
 Loganville Christian Academy
 Trinity Prep School
 Victory Baptist School

Points of interest
 Vines Botanical Gardens
 Kent Rock Manor, used as the Salvatore Boarding School for the Young & Gifted in the CW show Legacies
 Holy Cross Cathedral, the cathedral of the Anglican Diocese of the South

Notable people
Bobby Byrd, singer with James Brown, founder of Rock and Roll Hall of Fame vocal group The Famous Flames.
Kyle Chandler, actor
Clint Frazier, Major League Baseball player
Jon Langston, country singer
Austin Meadows, Major League Baseball player
Brandon Moss, Major League Baseball player
Jordan Pruitt, pop singer
Jeffrey Webb, former president of CONCACAF who was arrested in the 2015 FIFA corruption case in May 2015
Wayne Gallman, NFL running back for the Minnesota Vikings
Jordan Rager, country singer

References

Bibliography

External links

 City of Loganville official website

Cities in Georgia (U.S. state)
Cities in Gwinnett County, Georgia
Cities in Walton County, Georgia
Cities in the Atlanta metropolitan area